The 2012–13 Southeastern Louisiana Lions basketball team represented Southeastern Louisiana University during the 2012–13 NCAA Division I men's basketball season. The Lions, led by ninth year head coach Jim Yarbrough, played their home games at the University Center and were members of the Southland Conference. They finished the season 13–18, 10–8 in Southland play to finish in fourth place. They advanced to the semifinals of the Southland tournament where they lost to Stephen F. Austin.

Roster

Schedule

|-
!colspan=9| Exhibition

|-
!colspan=9|Non conference Regular season

|-
!colspan=9| Southland Regular season

 

|-
!colspan=9| 2013 Southland Conference men's basketball tournament

References

Southeastern Louisiana Lions basketball seasons
Southeastern Louisiana
2012 in sports in Louisiana
2013 in sports in Louisiana